Robotech is an 85-episode adaptation of three different Japanese anime science fiction television series, Super Dimension Fortress Macross, Super Dimension Cavalry Southern Cross and Genesis Climber Mospeada, under the direction of Carl Macek. Robotech was originally aired in syndication starting in 1985 and has been seen in North America, Australia, the Philippines, Hong Kong, South Africa and Europe. Within the combined and edited story, Robotechnology refers to the scientific advances discovered in an alien starship that crashed on a South Pacific island.  With this technology, Earth developed giant robotic machines (many of which were capable of transforming into vehicles) to fight three successive extraterrestrial invasions.

Episode list

Part 1: The Macross Saga

Part 2: The Masters

Part 3: The New Generation

Bibliography
Robotech Art I: The Official Guide to the Robotech Universe by Kay Reynolds and Ardith Carlton. The Donning Company, 1986.

References

External links

Robotech
Robotech